Cynthia Coffman can refer to:
 Cynthia Coffman (politician) (born 1961), lawyer and politician from the state of Colorado
 Cynthia Coffman (murderer), convicted murderer from the state of California